Pittsburgh Maulers  may refer to:

 Pittsburgh Maulers (1984), United States Football League team
 Pittsburgh Maulers (2022), United States Football League team